Hileithia rhehabalis is a moth in the family Crambidae. It was described by Harrison Gray Dyar Jr. in 1914. It is found in Panama.

The wingspan is about 13 mm. The forewings are white with a slender and faint inner line on the forewings.

References

Moths described in 1914
Spilomelinae